Ricardo Ycaza (born 16 February 1958) is an Ecuadorian tennis player who was a world top 10 junior, a Davis Cup stalwart, and a world top 100 touring professional.

Tennis career
His most noteworthy achievement was winning the 1976 US Open Junior tournament. In the semifinals of that tournament he staged a third-set comeback to defeat John McEnroe after saving two match points at 2–5 in the third set and after coming back from 2–4 in the third-set tiebreaker. (Ycaza was to face McEnroe three more times in junior tournaments, winning each time.) In the final, Ycaza defeated José Luis Clerc of Argentina. In May 1977, Ycaza again defeated John McEnroe in three sets to win the World Championship of Tennis Men's 21-and-under tournament in Houston, Texas.

Coached by Miguel Olvera at the Guayaquil Tennis Club, Ycaza had a successful junior career, winning numerous South American junior titles. At the college level, he achieved All-American status for the 1976–1977 NCAA season playing for the University of Houston. Ycaza represented Ecuador in Davis Cup matches from 1973 through 1986, teaming up with long-time friend and French Open champion Andrés Gómez in several important doubles triumphs against the likes of Argentina and Brazil. After his playing days were over, Ycaza also served as Davis Cup captain for Ecuador.

Ycaza played on the professional tennis tour from 1977 to 1986. His career high rankings were world No. 45 in singles and No. 32 in doubles. During his professional career, he won three doubles tournaments (each with different partners). His best year on the professional tour was 1980 when he won doubles tournaments at Sarasota, Palermo, and Santiago.

ATP Tour finals

Singles(1 runner-up)

Doubles (3 titles, 4 runner-ups)

External links

1958 births
Living people
Ecuadorian male tennis players
Sportspeople from Guayaquil
Grand Slam (tennis) champions in boys' singles
US Open (tennis) junior champions
Tennis players at the 1975 Pan American Games
Pan American Games competitors for Ecuador
Houston Cougars men's tennis players